Tamang (Nepali:तामाङ) is a Nepalese surname.

Notable people with the surname include:
Robin Tamang, Nepalese musician, and actor
Binay Tamang, Indian politician, chairman of the Gorkhaland Territorial Administration (GTA)
Buddhi Tamang, Nepalese actor
Prashant Tamang, Indian singer
Madan Tamang, Indian politician
Devendra Tamang, Nepalese footballer
Anju Tamang, Indian footballer
Ananta Tamang, Nepalese footballer
Prem Singh Tamang, Indian politician, founder of the Sikkim Krantikari Morcha (SKM)
Shambu Tamang, Nepalese climber
Bimala Tamang, Nepalese female karateka
Ratnajit Tamang, Nepalese badminton player

Surnames of Nepalese origin
Indian surnames